The 1845 United States House of Representatives election in Florida was held on Monday, May 26, 1845, to elect the first United States Representative from the state of Florida, one from the state's single at-large congressional district, to represent Florida in the 29th Congress. The election coincided with the elections of other offices, including the gubernatorial election, the senatorial elections, and various state and local elections.

The winning candidate would have served a less-than-two-year term in the United States House of Representatives from July 1, 1845, to March 4, 1847.

Background
Florida was admitted to the Union as a slave state on March 3, 1845, the last day of the 28th Congress. The state was not represented in that Congress. Florida held its elections on May 26, 1845.

Candidates

Democratic

Nominee 

 David Levy Yulee, former delegate for the Florida Territory's at-large congressional district

Whig

Nominee 

 Benjamin Alexander Putnam, adjutant general during the Second Seminole War

General election

Results

Results by County

Aftermath 
Because Yulee was jointly elected to both the U.S. House and the U.S. Senate and a person cannot hold both offices at the same time, he resigned from the House before taking his seat. A special election was held later in 1845 to elect his replacement, electing Whig Edward Carrington Cabell, though after a recount, Democrat William Henry Brockenbrough was found to be the winner instead.

See also
1844 and 1845 United States House of Representatives elections

References

1845
Florida
United States House of Representatives